Oostanaula is an unincorporated community in Gordon County, in the U.S. state of Georgia.

History
A post office called Oostanaula was established in 1881, and remained in operation until being discontinued in 1920. Oostanaula is a name derived from the Cherokee language meaning "shoally river".

References

Unincorporated communities in Gordon County, Georgia
Unincorporated communities in Georgia (U.S. state)